The Mommies is an American sitcom television series created by Terry Grossman and Kathy Speer that aired on NBC from September 18, 1993, to June 10, 1995.

NBC originally canceled The Mommies after one season along with other Saturday night sitcoms Café Americain and Nurses.  Due to increased ratings during summer reruns NBC renewed the series for midseason with some tweaks in format (as well as its title shortened to simply Mommies). However, the ratings dropped again in season 2, and the series was pulled in the spring of 1995, with its final episode being burned off over the summer.

Synopsis
The series was loosely based on the real-life personas of Caryl Kristensen and Marilyn Kentz (aka The Mommies) as suburban neighbors and their families in Petaluma, California. Episodes focused on how they dealt with parenting and modern-day issues. The duo also co-produced and co-wrote the series.  Neighbors "Perfect Mom" Barb Ballantine (Julia Duffy) and "Mr. Mom" Tom Booker (Jere Burns) were introduced in the middle of season one with Duffy becoming a series regular.

Season two brought several changes to the series.  Jere Burns was upgraded to series regular, Paul Kellogg was recast, Marilyn got divorced, and Barb's never before seen husband (played by fellow Newhart alum Peter Scolari) became recurring.  Also laugh track usage was reduced.

Cast

Main 
 Caryl Kristensen - Caryl Kellogg
 Marilyn Kentz - Marilyn Larson
 Robin Thomas (season 1) and Lane Davies (season 2) - Paul Kellogg, Caryl's husband
 Ashley Peldon - Kasey Larson, Marilyn & Jack's daughter
 Shiloh Strong - Adam Larson, Marilyn & Jack's son
 Sam Gifaldi - Danny Kellogg, Caryl & Paul's son
 Ryan Merriman - Blake Kellogg, Caryl & Paul's son
 David Dukes - Jack Larson, Marilyn's husband
 Julia Duffy - Barb Ballantine
 Jere Burns - Tom Booker (1994-1995: recurring, season 1; main, season 2)

Recurring 
 Jennifer Blanc - Tiffany (1993-1994)
 Peter Scolari - Ken Ballantine, Barb's husband
 Courtney Peldon - Beth Booker, Tom's daughter (1994-1995)
 Justin Berfield - Jason Booker, Tom's son (1994-1995)

Episodes

Season 1 (1993–94)

Season 2 (1995)

Awards and nominations

References

External links
 

1990s American sitcoms
1993 American television series debuts
1995 American television series endings
English-language television shows
NBC original programming
Television shows set in Sonoma County, California
Television series by CBS Studios